Demirkapı is a small village in Mut district of Mersin Province, Turkey. The winter (settled) population of the village was only 53 as of 2012.

References

Villages in Mut District